Robert K. C. Forman, is a former professor of religion at the City University of New York, author of several studies on religious experience, and co-editor of the Journal of Consciousness Studies.

Biography
Forman is a long-term Transcendental meditation practitioner, with over 40 years of practice. After two years of practice he had his first "break-through" during a nine-month meditation retreat: 

	 
This initial experience led him to pursuing a PhD at Columbia University, and an academic career in religious studies.

Academic career
Forman has worked as professor of religion at City University of New York, both Hunter College and City College, and is Founding Executive Director of The Forge Institute for Spirituality and Social Change. His books include The Problems of Pure Consciousness, The Innate Capacity and "Enlightenment Ain't What It's Cracked Up to Be".

As well as editing a number of books on the topic of consciousness and mysticism, Forman has worked as co-editor of the Journal of Consciousness Studies. He has also collaborated with Ken Wilber on work (Forman, Wilber & Andresen, 2000).

Criticism of constructivism
Forman has taken a strong stance against Katz' constructivism, and can be understood as a defender of the perennialist position on mystical experience, the view that there is indeed a core experience common to mystics of all creeds, cultures and generations. Notable representatives of this perennial philosophy school, such as William James, Evelyn Underhill, James Bissett Pratt, Mircea Eliade and Walter Terence Stace, argue that mystical experience gives a direct contact with an absolute reality, which is thereafter interpreted according to one's religious and cultural background.

This position has been strongly criticised by constructivists, most strongly and influently by Steven T. Katz, starting with his 1978 publication Mysticism and Pholosophical Analysis. According to Forman, these criticisms center around three points:
 Perennialists have a naive and mistaken methodology in their approach of primary texts, which are mistranslated, quoted out of context, and misinterpreted;
 Perennialists assume an underlying similarity without proving this. Their assumptions are the starting point for presenting quotes which superficially sound the same, without a thorough and careful analysis of these quotes and their context;
 Perennialists are hermenuetically naive. They merely "divine" the experiences on which these texts are supposedly based, without a proper philosophical or methodological argument for the move from text to the postulated experience behind it.

Forman has criticised the constructivist stance, specifically criticising Katz article Language, Epistemology and Mysticism (1978). According to Forman, Katz commits the fallacy of petitio principii, that is, making a statement without providing evidence, but only providing arguments. According to Forman, Katz' argument is systematically incomplete, since it implies that any difference in religious beliefs and assumptions leads to different experiences. Yet, according to Forman, the same experience may be described in different terms, such as samadhi and sunyata.

Forman further criticises Katz for his inability to take into account novel experiences, of persons who are not trained in mystical traditions, which resemble trained mystical experiences, yet are not invoked by mystical practices. According to Forman, one can have a mystical experience, and only later recognise it as similar to those acquired in mystical traditions.

Pure Consciousness Event

Description of PCE
Forman defines mysticism as "a set of experiences or more precisely, conscious events, which are not described in terms of sensory experience or mental images." Following Roland Fischer, Forman makes a distinction between ergotropic and trophotropic mystical states. Ergotropic mystical states are hallucinations, visions and auditory experiences, whereas samadhi and other wakefull states are tropotropic. Forman restricts the term "mysticism" to the tropotropic states.

Forman argues that there is a phenomenon which he calls the "Pure Consciousness Event," a "wakefull though contentless (nonintentional) consciousness." It is the same as samadhi, and a form of Walter Stace's introvertive mysticism. In transcendental meditation, it is called transcendental consciousness; it is the fourth of seven states of consciousness, and the first of four transcendental states of consciousness, which eventually end in full enlightenment.

According to James H. Austin, commenting on Forman's descriptions of his personal experiences with this sense of silence and bottomlessness, Forman also stated that although background thoughts disappeared, there was also an "element of promise," "a gratuitous subconscious process of incubation." Forman himself gives the example of a student who asks him a question: "Although he is aware that his conscious mind is "completely silent," yet the correct answer still pops up to the surface of his mind out of the background of this "richly pregnant silence.""

Forman equates sahaja samadhi with Stace's extroverted mysticism, noting that Stace considered "introverted mysticism" to be a higher form of mysticism than "extroverted mysticism." Forman disagrees, referring to Ramana Maharshi, who repeatedly stated that sahaja samadhi, effortless samadhi, was a further development than samadhi, absorption.  The same stance is taken in transcendental meditation, where the highest stages of consciousness continue throughout waking activity.

According to Forman, constructivism is not able to account for the PCE as being a constructed event. According to Forman, a mystical experience may be shaped or constructed in three senses: content, form, shaping-process. All three fail for the PCE:
 Form: PCE's are contentless, and therefore not shaped by "forms" or "schemata."
 Content: PCE's are contentless; they can also occur in neophytes;and they occur in various mystical traditions, despite their differences in states of religious beliefs and expectations.
 Shaping-process: PCE's are not a series of events which shape each other, but are a continuous event of the same experience.

Forman describes the stages leading to the PCE, such as the Buddhist formless jhanas, as a series of successive stages in which cognitive schemata are "forgotten," leading to an "empty" state of consciousness.

Forman questions the doctrine of intentionality insofar as he claims that, during a Pure Consciousness Event, cognition may lack an intentional object.

Criticism
Lola Williamson interviewed TM-practitioners. In contrast to Forman's statements she notes that those transcendent experiences show variations between various TM-practitioners, and are also not contentless.

Yaroslav Komarovski (2015) notes that the idea of a PCE has a very limited applicability in Tibetan Buddhism. According to Komarovski, the realization of emptiness as described in the Buddhist Madhyamaka tradition is different from the PCE. Not only the realization itself is different, but also the causes and the subsequent influence on the personality. According to Komarovski, it is brought about by specific Buddhist techniques, and results in specific Buddhist objectives, thereby illustrating the opposite of what Forman argues. According to Komarovski, to force the PCE into the spectrum of Tibetan Buddhist practices, it would be, at best, one of the minor events, and not the key mystical experience. Rather, according to Komarvski, "certain experiences and mental states adresses by Tibetan thinkers are treated as PCE due to an oversimplification of and confusion about the nature of those experiences."

Works

The Innate Capacity
In The Innate Capacity, he gives the example of a man who had the Buddhist experience of satori, although not himself a Buddhist at the time, and only later learnt about satori. Indeed, even if one did learn about an experience and later have it, in Forman's view this does not prove that the learning causes the experience; to think in this way would, in Forman's view, be to commit the logical error of post hoc ergo propter hoc.

Enlightenment Ain't What It's Cracked Up to Be
Enlightenment Ain't What It's Cracked Up to Be, Forman's most popular book, is his most personal book. Using his own experience as a touchstone, the volume is an exploration into the experiential nuances of and nature of spiritual enlightenment. Forman describes both the illusions that many gurus have communicated about it, and the nature of the disillusionment process. Tapping his own 40 years of experience of such a permanent shift, Forman describes the long term value of enlightenment as he came to view it: the honesty and authenticity that it serves to encourage. The book teaches however mostly through its tone of honesty and authentic seeking, offering a teaching through the quality of writing and openness.

Publications

Books by Forman
Forman, R.K.C. (ed.) (1990). The Problem of Pure Consciousness: Mysticism and Philosophy. Oxford University Press.
Forman, R.K.C. (1994). (ed.) Meister Eckhart: Mystic as Theologian: An Experiment in Methodology. Rockport, MASSACHUSETTS: Houghton Mifflin. (Published by Element in 1991).
Forman, R.K.C. (1997). Mysticism, Mind, Consciousness. New York: State University of New York Press
Forman, R.K.C. (ed.).  (1998). The Innate Capacity: Mysticism, Philosophy and Psychology. New York, Oxford: Oxford University Press.
Forman, R.K.C., Wilber, K. & Andresen, J. (2000). Cognitive Models and Spi Maps: Interdisciplinary Explorations of Religious Experience. Journal of Consciousness Studies. Imprint Academic.
Forman, R.K.C. (2004). Grassroots Spirituality: What It Is, Why It Is Here, Where It Is Going. Exeter and Charlottesville: Imprint Academic. 
Forman, R.K.C. (2011). Enlightenment Ain't What It's Cracked Up To Be. John Hunt, UK. O-Books.

Articles by Forman
Forman, R.K.C. (1998). What does mysticism have to teach us about consciousness? Journal of Consciousness Studies, 5 (2) 185–201

See also 
 Mysticism
 Hjalmar Sundén
 Turiya

Notes

References

Sources

Printed sources

Web-sources

External links 
 Robert K. C. Forman Homepage
 The Forge Institute (directed by Forman)
 Buddha at the Gas Pump, Interview with Robert Forman
 Marion Institute, Words of Truth: an interview with Robert K.C. Forman
 Promotional website of Enlightenment Ain't...
 Robert Forman (1996), WHAT DOES MYSTICISM HAVE TO TEACH US ABOUT CONSCIOUSNESS?

Living people
Philosophers of religion
American consciousness researchers and theorists
Hunter College faculty
Place of birth missing (living people)
Year of birth missing (living people)
Mysticism scholars